The Metropolitan Commons Act 1878 (41 & 42 Vict c 71) is an Act of the Parliament of the United Kingdom that amended the Metropolitan Commons Act 1866 and the Metropolitan Commons Amendment Act 1869.

It is one of the Metropolitan Commons Acts 1866 to 1878.

References
Burrows, Roland (ed). Halsbury's Statutes of England. Second Edition. Butterworth & Co (Publishers) Ltd. Bell Yard, Temple Bar, London. 1949. Volume 3. Page 237.
Halsbury's Statutes of England. (The Complete Statutes of England). First Edition. Butterworth & Co (Publishers) Ltd. Bell Yard, Temple Bar, London. 1929. Volume 2:  . Page 602.
John Mounteney Lely. "Metropolitan Commons Act, 1878". The Statutes of Practical Utility. (Chitty's Statutes). Fifth Edition. Sweet and Maxwell. Stevens and Sons. Chancery Lane, London. 1894. Volume 5. Title "Inclosure". Subtitle "Inclosure (Metropolis)". Pages 212 and 213.
Edmund Humphrey Woolrych. The Metropolis Local Management Acts. Second Edition. Shaw and Sons. Fetter Lane and Crane Court, London. 1880. Pages 355 and 356.

External links
Metropolitan Commons Act 1878 (original text)

United Kingdom Acts of Parliament 1878
1878 in London
Acts of the Parliament of the United Kingdom concerning London